Blockbusting is an unethical business practice used in the United States real estate market.

Blockbusting may also refer to:
 Games
 Blockbusting (game), a combinatorial game in which players occupy cells on a  strip
 Popils, a video game known in Europe as Popils The Blockbusting Challenge
 Books
 A book by 
 A book by

See also 
 Blockbuster (disambiguation)